FC Venus is a 2005 Finnish romantic comedy film directed by Joona Tena.

A German remake of the film was released in 2006.

Plot 
Pete is a football enthusiast, who plays for FC HeMan, a team playing in the lowest possible league. His girlfriend, Anna, hates the whole sport. Pete and his teammates are planning to travel to watch the Football World Cup held in Germany. Anna is not excited about Pete's plan to leave her alone for the summer. Therefore, Anna decides to present a challenge to Pete: She will form a team from the wives and girlfriends of the FC HeMan players, and then the women's team (FC Venus) would play against FC HeMan. If the women's team wins, the men will have to give up football, and if the men's team wins, the women will pay their tickets to the World cup.

Cast 
 Minna Haapkylä as Anna
 Petteri Summanen as Pete
 Laura Malmivaara as Carita
 Miia Nuutila as Katariina
 Taneli Mäkelä as Lauri
 Lotta Lehtikari as Mara
 Janne Virtanen as Sebastian
 Eero Tommila as Niko

References

External links 
 
 

2005 romantic comedy films
2005 films
Association football films
Films set in the 2000s
Films set in Helsinki
Films shot in Finland
Finnish romantic comedy films